Ballymena railway station serves the town of Ballymena in County Antrim, Northern Ireland. It is located just outside Ballymena town centre on the Galgorm Road, and is integrated with the local bus station. The station is operated by Northern Ireland Railways.

History
The first station in Ballymena opened on 11 April 1848 by the Belfast and Ballymena Railway. This initial station was rebuilt and relocated on 4 December 1855 when the Ballymena, Ballymoney, Coleraine and Portrush Junction Railway extended the line northwards.

At one time, there were several other stations in the Ballymena area, however the only other one which survives to this day is Cullybackey.

 Ballymena, Cushendall and Red Bay Railway - which opened in 1875 and closed in 1940
 Ballymena and Larne Railway - which opened in 1877 and closed in 1933

The station buildings were rebuilt in 1903-1904 to designs by Berkeley Deane Wise. The rebuilding cost in excess of £15,000 (equivalent to £ in ). The clock was provided by Sharman D. Neill of Belfast, and iron water storage towers were constructed by Cowan Sheldon and Company of Carlisle. On 19 May 1921 the station suffered an arson attack by the Irish Republican Army.

The original station buildings were removed in 1981-1982 during a modernisation programme by Northern Ireland Railways.

Current services
Ballymena railway station consists of two platforms and serves as a passing point on the mainly single-track Belfast-Derry railway line.

In the other direction there is an hourly service to Great Victoria street

References

Railway stations in County Antrim
Ballymena
Railway stations opened in 1848
Railway stations served by NI Railways
1848 establishments in Ireland
Railway stations in Northern Ireland opened in 1848